Brenda Holmes (born 27 April 1958) is a Canadian former swimmer. She competed in the women's 800 metre freestyle at the 1972 Summer Olympics.

References

External links
 

1958 births
Living people
Canadian female swimmers
Olympic swimmers of Canada
Swimmers at the 1972 Summer Olympics
Swimmers from Edmonton
Canadian female freestyle swimmers
20th-century Canadian women
21st-century Canadian women